The Andrew Clark House, also known as the Haskell House, is a historic house on Ross Hill Road in Lisbon, Connecticut.  Built about 1798, it is a good example of transitional Georgian-Federal residential architecture.  It was listed on the National Register of Historic Places on June 28, 1979.

Description and history
It is a -story wood-frame structure, five bays wide, with a side-gable roof and a large central chimney. A -story ell, once a freestanding house, was added in the 18th century and extends to the rear. A second addition extends even further from the ell; it was added in the 20th century as a sensitive contribution to the house, and used period parts from a Rhode Island house. The main features of the house's main facade are a second-story Palladian window, and a pavilion sheltering the main entrance. Although the basic structure of the main house is Georgian, its styling is more Federal, reflecting the transitional period of its 1798 construction date.

Land for the house was purchased in 1792 by Andrew Clark, a wealthy farmer who also served as a state representative.  This house is presumed to have been built in 1798, based on the panel with that date in the chimney.  The panel resembles a similar one in a house in the nearby village of Newent, suggesting the house was built by an itinerant craftsman.  After Clark and his wife died (apparently childless), the house passed into the Haskell (or Herskell) family of her sister.

See also
National Register of Historic Places listings in New London County, Connecticut

References

Houses on the National Register of Historic Places in Connecticut
Georgian architecture in Connecticut
Houses completed in 1798
Lisbon, Connecticut
Houses in New London County, Connecticut
National Register of Historic Places in New London County, Connecticut
1740 establishments in the Thirteen Colonies